Pistacia cucphuongensis is a species of plant in the family Anacardiaceae. It is endemic to Vietnam.

References

cucphuongensis
Endemic flora of Vietnam
Vulnerable plants
Taxonomy articles created by Polbot